The Kunstmuseum Wolfsburg is an art museum in central Wolfsburg, Lower Saxony, opened 1994. It presents modern and contemporary art and is financed by the Kunststiftung Volkswagen.

It takes up aspects of the industrial city of Wolfsburg, which was only founded in 1938: modernity, urbanity, internationality and quality. The Kunstmuseum is located at the southern end of the pedestrian zone in the vicinity of the Alvar-Aalto-Kulturhaus, Theater, Planetarium and CongressPark.

The museum
The Kunstmuseum Wolfsburg opened in 1994 with a retrospective exhibition on the French artist Fernand Léger. The museum's founding director was the Dutchman Gijs van Tuyl, who remained in the position until 2004. He was followed by the Swiss art historian Markus Brüderlin, who was director from January 2006 until his death in March 2014. The museum has been headed since February 1, 2015 by Ralf Beil, from 2006 director of the Institut Mathildenhöhe Darmstadt. On April 1, 2019, he was succeeded by Andreas Beitin, previously director of the Aachen Ludwig Forum for International Art.

Architecture
The Hamburg architectural firm of Peter Schweger and Partners planned the building of the Kunstmuseum Wolfsburg as a transparent urban loggia with an extensive overarching glass roof over the open Hollerplatz. The central exhibition hall is 16-meter high with a quadratic ground plan measuring 40 meters on each side. Its flexible possibilities allow for an individualized architecture conceived to meet the specific needs of each show. The hall is two-storied on three of its sides and enclosed by further exhibition spaces. The entire exhibition surface encompasses 3500 square meters. In conjunction with the 2007 Japan and the West exhibition, a Japan Garden was created in the inner courtyard of the building. The architect Kazuhisa Kawamura modeled it after the Zen garden of the Ryōan-ji temple in Kyōto and included elements from the architecture of Mies van der Rohe to symbolize the dialog between East and West.

Exhibitions
Since its opening, the Kunstmuseum Wolfsburg has presented over 130 exhibitions on modern and contemporary art. Large-scale retrospectives from the field of classic modern art, for example Fernand Léger and Bart van der Leck, alternate with survey shows such as Full House, German Open, The Italian Metamorphosis 1943–1968 and Blast to Freeze. Monographic exhibitions devoted to contemporary artists include Carl Andre, Andy Warhol, Luc Tuymans, Olafur Eliasson, Frank Stella, James Turrell and Imi Knoebel. With the start of the new directorship in 2006, the exhibition program placed contentual accents in large-scale historical and thematic shows (ArchiSkulptur, Japan and the West, Interior/Exterior, The Art of Deceleration), solo exhibitions (James Turrell and Alberto Giacometti) as well as in mid-career retrospectives (including Douglas Gordon, Neo Rauch and Philip Taaffe) that took up the theme of modernism in the 21st century, illuminating it from various perspectives. Different exhibitions are shown in the hall and the gallery. With “Wolfsburg Unlimited. A City as World Laboratory,” Ralf Beil presented his first major exhibition in which the city was reflected in the museum – and the museum in the city.

The collection
The Kunstmuseum Wolfsburg began collecting international contemporary art in 1994. The range included late modernism, Minimal Art, Conceptual Art and Arte Povera. Works by a younger generation of artists were subsequently added. Focus was placed on prominent major works, ensembles and work phases as well as the exemplary presentation of artistic developments. Instead of documenting “tendencies,” the concentration was placed on artists and works representing central aspects of the wide field of contemporary art. Artists in the collection include Carl Andre, Christian Boltanski, Douglas Gordon, Andreas Gursky, Georg Herold, Anselm Kiefer, Mario Merz, Gerhard Merz, Bruce Nauman, Neo Rauch, Burhan Dogancay, Cindy Sherman, Philip Taaffe, Jeff Wall, Olafur Eliasson, Douglas Gordon, Thomas Schütte and Jeppe Hein. Works from the collection are integrated into the museum's exhibitions or highlighted in special temporary shows devoted to the collection.

Further facilities
The Kunstmuseum is sponsored and supported by the Freundeskreis Kunstmuseum Wolfsburg e. V., into which the “Junge Freunde” [Young Friends] are integrated as youthful sponsors. The Studio is a generously sized space that the museum uses for school projects, workshops and creative programs. The museum restaurant Awilon and an in-house museum shop are also parts of the museum's offers.

The foundation
The Kunstmuseum Wolfsburg is financed by the non-profit Kunststiftung Volkswagen. A large part of its funds derive from the foundation of Asta and Christian Holler, the former owners of the Volkswagen Versicherungsdienst GmbH (VVD). Christian Holler (1900–1969) and his wife Asta (1904–1989), decided early on to bequeath their entire estate to the common good. After Asta Holler's death in 1990, the Holler-Stiftung was accordingly established in Munich with the purpose of providing funds to benefit youth welfare, the care of the seriously ill as well as the promotion of science and art. Since 1991, the Kunstmuseum receives a large percentage of the disbursements of the Holler-Stiftung, which had already made the largest contribution to the museum's buildings costs.

Exhibitions (selection)
 1994/1995: Man Ray. ‚Neues wie Vertrautes‘: Fotografien 1919–1942
 1995/1996: Nobuyoshi Araki – Tokyo Novelle
 1995/1996: Nam June Paik – High Tech Allergy
 1996: Carl Andre. Sculptor 1996
 1996: Jeff Wall – Landscapes and other Pictures
 1997: Pietro Donzelli. The Light of Solitude
 1998: Andreas Gursky – Photographs 1994–1998
 2000: Ed van der Elsken. Sweet Life
 2005/2006: Hussein Chalayan
 2006: Neo Rauch – New Rols
 2007: Between Darkness & Light. Douglas Gordon
 2009: Interieur/Exterieur: Living Art
 2009/2010: Undeiably me. 1309 Face.
 2009/2010: James Turrell. The Wolfsburg Project
 2010: Rudolf Steiner and Contemporary Art and Rudolf Steiner: Alchemy of the Everyday  (double exhibition)
 2010: Alberto Giacometti – The Origin of Space. A comprehensive retrospective of the artist's mature work
 2011: Art & Fashion. Between Skin and Clothing
 2011: Gerwald Rockenschaub. Multidial
 2011/2012: The Geometry of the Moment. Landscapes. Henri Cartier-Bresson
 2011/2012: The Art of Deceleration. Motion and Rest in Art from Caspar David Friedrich to Ai Wei Wei.
 2012: Frank Stella – The Retrospective. Works 1958–2012
 2012/2013: Ornament. Perspectives on Modernism. Ornamental Prints from Dürer to Piranesi
 2013: Christian Boltanski. Moved.
 2013: Slapstick! Alÿs, Bock, Chaplin, Hein, Laurel & Hardy, Keaton, Matta-Clark u. a.
 2013/2014: Art & Textiles – Fabric as Material and Concept in Modern Art from Klimt to the Present  
 2014: Oskar Kokoschka. Humanist and Rebel
 2014: RealSurReal – Masterpieces of Avant-Garde Photography. Das Neue Sehen 1920 – 1950. Siegert Collection 
 2015: Walk the Line. New Paths in Drawing
 2015: Erwin Wurm. Fichte
 2015/2016: Dark Mirror. Art from Latinamerica since 1968
 2015/2016: Jeppe Hein. This Way
 2016: Wolfsburg Unlimited. A City as world laboratory 
 2016/17: In the Cage of Freedom
 2017: This Was Tomorrow. Pop Art in Great Britain
 2017: Pieter Hugo. Between the Devil and the Deep Blue Sea.
 2017: Hans Op de Beeck. Out of the Ordinary
 2017/2018: Never Ending Stories. The Loop in Art, Film, Architecture, Music, Literature and Cultural History
 2018: Robert Lebeck. 1968
 2018: Facing India
 2019: Now Is The Time. 25 years collection Kunstmuseum Wolfsburg
 2019/2020: Robin Rhode. Memory Is the Weapon
 2019/2020: Inside – Out. Construction of the Self
 2019/2020: Ryoji Ikeda. Data-verse
 2020: Barbara Kasten. Works
 2020: Ulrich Hensel. In-Between Worlds
 2020/2021: On Everyone’s Lips. From Pieter Bruegel to Cindy Sherman
 2021: Mischa Kuball. ReferenzRäume
 2021/2022: Oil. Beauty and Horror in the Petrol Age
 2021/2022: Menschenbilder (Images of Humanity)
 2021/2022: True Pictures? LaToya Ruby Frazier
 2022: Power! Light!
 2022/2023: Empowerment

Catalogues (selection)
 Pietro Donzelli. The Light of Solitude. Cantz, Ostfildern 1997, .
 Andreas Gursky – Photographs 1994–1998. Cantz, Ostfildern 1998, .
 Ed van der Elsken. Sweet Life 1949–2000. Wolfsburg 2000, .
 Neo Rauch – New Rols. DuMont, Köln 2006, 
 James Turrell. The Wolfsburg Project.
 Gerwald Rockenschaub. Multidial. Kerber, Bielefeld 2011, . 
 Art & Fashion. Between Skin and Clothing. Kerber, Bielefeld/ Leipzig/ Berlin, .
 The Art of Deceleration. Hatje Cantz, Ostfildern 2011, 978-3775732437
 Frank Stella – Retrospective. Hatje Cantz, Ostfildern 2012, 
 Art & Textiles. Fabric as Material and Concept in Modern Art from Klimt to the PresentHatje Cantz, Ostfildern 2013, 
 Dark Mirror: Art from Latin America since 1968. Works from the Daros Latinamerica Collection. 2015, 
 Julian Rosefeldt. Midwest. 2016, .
 This Was Tomorrow. Wienand Verlag, Köln 2016, 
 Hans Op de Beeck. Works. Lannoo, Kunstmuseum Wolfsburg, 2017, .
 Never Ending Stories. Hatje Cantz, Ostfildern 2017, ISBN 978-3-7757-4364-8
 Robert Lebeck 1968. Steidl, Göttingen 2018
 Facing India: India from a Female Point of View, Hatje Cantz, Ostfildern, 2020, ISBN 978-3775744010
 Now Is The Time. Hatje Cantz, Ostfildern 2019, ISBN 978-3-7757-4529-1
 Robin Rhode. Memory Is The Weapon. Hatje Cantz, Ostfildern 2019, ISBN 978-3-7757-4605-2
 Barbara Kasten. Works. König, Walther, 2020, ISBN 978-3-9609-8774-1
 On Everyone’s Lips. The Oral Cavity in Art and Culture – catalogue. Hatje Cantz, Ostfildern, 2020, ISBN 9783775748001
 Oil. Beauty and Horror in the Petrol Age. Kunstmuseum Wolfsburg. König, Walther, 2021, ISBN ‎ 978-3753300962
 Power! Light! König, Walther, 2022, ISBN 978-3960988502
 Checkpoint - Border Views from Korea/Grenzblicke aus Korea. 2022.
 Empowerment. Art and Feminisms, Bundeszentrale für politische Bildung, 2022.

References

External links

Art museums and galleries in Germany
Museums in Lower Saxony
Buildings and structures in Wolfsburg